Pastorizo Bay is a bay 2 nautical miles (3.7 km) wide, indenting the south side of Vega Island just west of Mahogany Bluff. The name appears on an Argentine chart of 1959.

Bays of the James Ross Island group